Love Lagna Locha is an Indian Marathi television serial produced by Vidyadhar Pathare. It started airing on Zee Yuva from 22 August 2016 and ended on 17 February 2018.

Plot summary 
It is a story of group of friends; Sumeet, Vinay and Raghav. Sumeet is career-minded, Raghav is flirty and Vinay is struggling to find a wife. The other friends are their colleagues and neighbours.

Cast

Main
 Omkar Govardhan as Sumeet
 Saksham Kulkarni as Vinay
 Vivek Sangle as Raghav (Raghvendra) 
 Ruchita Jadhav as Kavya
 Shrikar Pitre as Abhiman
 Siddhi Karkhanis as Shalmali
 Sameeha Sule as Akansha
 Akshaya Gurav as Soumya
 Anuja Prabhukeluskar as Puja
 Mayuri Wagh as Rutu
 Pallavi Patil as Rucha

Recurring
 Vijay Nikam as More Kaka
 Sneha Raikar as More Kaku
 Sameer Khandekar as Shrikant More
 Ramesh Wani as Harishchandra Nagpurkar (Vinay's father)
 Pournima Ahire as Vinay's mother
 Shubhangi Latkar as Maasaheb (Raghav's mother) 
 Rohan Gujar as Vinay's friend

Guest appearance
 Prarthana Behere
 Kranti Redkar

References

External links 
 Love Lagna Locha on IMDb

Zee Yuva original programming
Marathi-language television shows
Indian television sitcoms